Robert Leslie Howland (25 March 1905 – 7 March 1986) was an English track and field athlete who competed in the shot put. He represented Great Britain in the 1928 Summer Olympics.

He was born in Berkhamsted and died in Saffron Walden.

In 1928 he finished 20th the Olympic shot put event.

At the 1930 British Empire Games he won the silver medal in the shot put competition. Four years later at the 1934 British Empire Games he won again the silver medal in the shot put contest.

He became a senior tutor and professor of Classics at St. John's College, Cambridge, England.

References

sports-reference.com

1905 births
1986 deaths
People from Berkhamsted
English male shot putters
Olympic athletes of Great Britain
Athletes (track and field) at the 1928 Summer Olympics
Commonwealth Games silver medallists for England
Commonwealth Games medallists in athletics
Athletes (track and field) at the 1930 British Empire Games
Athletes (track and field) at the 1934 British Empire Games
Medallists at the 1930 British Empire Games
Medallists at the 1934 British Empire Games